The Church of St. Michael is a parish church in the Roman Catholic Archdiocese of New York, located at 424 West 34th Street, in Manhattan, New York City.

Churches

Original location
The parish was founded in 1857 as an offshoot of the Church of St. Columba and Holy Cross Church, with boundaries from "28th to 38th Street and from 6th Avenue to the banks of the Hudson." The community initially met in a chapel structure of renovated townhouses. The original church plan was begun in 1861 and completed in 1868, with a front on 31st Street, between 9th and 10th Avenues. The church was built in phases surrounding the chapel and without disturbing services there. It was designed by the founding pastor, Arthur J. Donnelly (1820–1890), and architect T.S. Wall. The church complex also consisted of a rectory, convent and schools, the latter designed by architect Lawrence J. O'Connor, FAIA. During 1874–1884, the complex was the original home of the Presentation Sisters in the northeastern United States, and enrollment grew to become the largest parochial schools in New York. The Sisters and the parish also founded the Mount Saint Michael Home for destitute children, in Greenridge, Staten Island. The Manhattan church contained an 1862 Henry Erben mechanical action organ. On May 4, 1892, a fire destroyed much of the church and the organ.

Second location 
O'Connor was contracted to design a new structure which incorporated the original tower and acquired a new Indiana bluff limestone facade on 32nd Street. Other details include a roof elevated  higher than the original church, a vaulted ceiling, aisles with groined arches, fourteen Munich stained glass windows, and a gallery in the form of a choir loft with a new 1893 Odell organ at the rear of the church. The blessing Mass was scheduled for Sunday, January 28, 1894. In 1892, the address was listed at 408 West 32nd Street.

Third location
In 1904, the Pennsylvania Railroad Company began proceedings for the construction of the North River Tunnels and Pennsylvania Station, which would require the demolition of St. Michael's 32nd Street church and complex. At the suggestion of the pastor, John A. Gleeson, the Archdiocese sold the parish properties in exchange for a new church, school, convent, and rectory on 34th Street. The office of Napoleon LeBrun & Sons was responsible for the construction of the new complex, which involved the salvage and re-use of the altar, organ, stained glass windows, and limestone facade. The church was dedicated November 10, 1907. It also had a 2,000-person basement chapel with an  ceiling.

References

External links
 Church of St. Michael

Roman Catholic churches in Manhattan
Hell's Kitchen, Manhattan
20th-century Roman Catholic church buildings in the United States
1857 establishments in New York (state)
34th Street (Manhattan)
Roman Catholic churches completed in 1907